Pacific Express was an all-jet airline in the western United States from 1982 to early  based in   marketed itself as Pan Am Pacific Express reflecting a marketing agreement between Pan American World Airways (Pan Am) and the carrier for connecting passenger traffic at Los Angeles and San Francisco. At one point, Pacific Express served 22 destinations in the western  It was a subsidiary of 

Pacific Express initially operated seven British Aircraft Corporation BAC One-Eleven twin jets and subsequently then added Boeing 737-200s.  It had six new British Aerospace BAe 146-200s on order but never took delivery; some of these BAe 146s were then purchased by Pacific Southwest Airlines (PSA).

Shortly after its second anniversary Pacific Express filed for bankruptcy in federal court and abruptly ceased operations on Thursday, 

The name Pacific Express is now the callsign of Pacific Airlines, the second largest airline in Vietnam.

Destinations
From the Pacific Express system timetable dated December 1, 1983.

Bakersfield, California (BFL) 
Boise, Idaho (BOI)
Chico, California (CIC) - Headquarters
Fresno, California (FAT)
Klamath Falls, Oregon (LMT)
Las Vegas, Nevada (LAS)
Los Angeles, California (LAX)
Medford, Oregon (MFR)
Modesto, California (MOD) 
Monterey, California (MRY)
Oakland, California (OAK)

Palm Springs, California (PSP)
Portland, Oregon (PDX)
Redding, California (RDD) 
Redmond/Bend, Oregon (RDM)
Reno, Nevada (RNO)
Sacramento, California (SMF)
San Francisco, California (SFO)
San Jose, California (SJC)
Santa Barbara, California (SBA)
Spokane, Washington (GEG)
Stockton, California (SCK)

Jet Fleet

 Boeing 737-200
 BAC One-Eleven

Ordered but not delivered:
 BAe 146-200

See also
List of defunct airlines of the United States

References

External links

Airline Maps – Pacific Express route map, December 1983
Justia: US Law – Pacific Express v. United Airlines (1992)

Defunct airlines of the United States
Airlines established in 1982
Airlines disestablished in 1984
1982 establishments in California